Zhaoping station is a railway station on the Alishan Forest Railway line located in Alishan Township, Chiayi County, Taiwan.

History
The station was opened on 14 March 1914. The station was in important hub for the logging industry and the largest log collection center during the Japanese rule. The station was re-inaugurated on 21 April 2013 after refurbishment made by Chiayi Forest District Office.

Nearby stations
 <-- Alishan Forest railway

Around the station
 Alishan Museum
 Zhaoping Park

See also
 List of railway stations in Taiwan

References

1914 establishments in Taiwan
Alishan Forest Railway stations
Railway stations in Chiayi County
Railway stations opened in 1914